Steven Basham may refer to:

Steve Basham (born 1977), English retired footballer
Steven L. Basham (born 1965), American lieutenant general